Devlin DeFrancesco (born January 17, 2000, Toronto, ON) is a Canadian-Italian auto racing driver currently competing in the IndyCar Series for Andretti Steinbrenner Autosport. Prior to racing single-seater cars, DeFrancesco also had a career in kart racing, finishing second in the 2013 Canadian National Junior Karting Championship, coming in second in the CSAI Italian Championship and third overall in the CIK FIA European Championship. In 2015, he was selected to be a part of the Generation Ganassi Driver Identification Program, a talent development program sponsored by Chip Ganassi Racing. In January 2022, DeFrancesco won the 60th running of the Daytona 24, alongside his teammates Eric Lux, Patricio O'Ward and Colton Herta.

Early life

Devlin was born on January 17, 2000, to Andrew and Cathy DeFrancesco. Born 15 weeks premature, Devlin only weighed a pound and his eyes were fused shut. Doctors did not expect him to survive, and he was given his last rites by the family priest. Devlin remained in Toronto's Sunnybrook Health Sciences Centre until he was nursed back to health.  Defying all odds, at age 6 he started to race go-karts.

Racing career

Devlin DeFrancesco began racing go-karts in 2006 at the age of 6. Competing in the series Florida Winter Tour and the SKUSA Pro Tour. In 2011, he spent a season racing in Italy's kart racing series where he finished 7th in the Final Cup race. By the end of 2011, he had set a record number of times on the podium with 12-straight national-level North American races.

In 2013, DeFrancesco competed in the Canadian National Junior Karting Championship. He crossed the line in first position, and after a partially-successful appeal of a penalty which placed him 19th due to initiating race-ending contact with another driver, he finished second overall. Competing in Europe in 2014, he placed 2nd overall in the Italian Championship and 3rd overall in the CIK FIA European Championship.  In 2014, he sustained an injury to his wrist that required two surgeries and that kept him out of a full racing series for roughly year. As part of his rehabilitation, Devlin attended the Carlin Academy, where he used a combination of simulators and on-track testing to prepare for FIA Formula 4-style racing.

In 2015, Devlin was selected to be a part of the Generation Ganassi Driver Identification Program, a mentoring and talent development program sponsored by Chip Ganassi Racing aiming to identify and assist up to 10 North American drivers between the ages of 13 and 18. During the official announcement, DeFrancesco was joined by IndyCar driver Tony Kanaan.

Ginetta Junior Championship

Graduating from karts in 2015, Devlin competed in the 2015 Ginetta Junior Championship with British team, HHC Motorsports. with a best result of 7th during the first race at the Knockhill Racing Circuit. Devlin also secured his first pole position at the Rockingham Motor Speedway, finishing his debut season with 66 points.

Toyota Racing Series

In early 2016, Devlin got his first taste of single-seater racing competing in New Zealand's Toyota Racing Series on the Giles Motorsport team. Over the course of the season, Devlin secured 7 top ten finishes, with a seasons best of 5th at Teretonga Park ending the season 10th overall with a total of 465 points.

MSA Formula
Devlin joined Carlin Motorsports for the 2016 MSA Formula season, graduating from the Carlin Academy  He took his first win at Thruxton, also securing the fastest lap of the race.  That same year, Devlin took 2 more wins one at Oulton Park and another in Croft.

Euroformula Open
Graduating to Europe, Devlin continued his collaboration with Carlin Motorsport in the Euroformula Open and Spanish Formula 3 Championships in 2017. A strong campaign saw him end the season as Spanish Formula 3 champion earning 3 wins and 5 podiums. Alongside an impressive Euroformula Open campaign, in which he took a victory and seven podiums, netting 3rd in the championship standings.

FIA Formula 3 European Championship 
Following his success in Spanish Formula 3 championship, Devlin joined the FIA Formula 3 European Championship for the final two rounds of the 2017 season.  He further teamed up with Carlin in 2018, taking to the track for the opening two races.  However was forced to withdraw from the following round to undergo a small dental surgery, which coincided with Round 3 at the Norisring in Germany  Following a full recovery, Devlin made the switch to join GP3 Series for the remainder of the 2018 season, teaming up with MP Motorsport.

GP3 Series 
Teaming up with MP Motorsport, Devlin joined the field at the second round on the calendar - Red Bull Ring. Tackling a fresh new challenge, Devlin rapidly got to grips with his machinery and relished the opportunity to race in the support series for Formula 1. Debuting in Austria, he earned 11th-place finish, narrowly missing out on points, but making up an astounding 9 places in only his first weekend behind the wheel.

Despite having to miss another round, due to illness, Devlin completed the year in 21st place, with a strong showing in all the remaining races. Equalling his best finish in the final round at Abu Dhabi.

FIA Formula 3 

In 2019, Devlin contested the inaugural FIA F3 championship, the series which was formed by the merger of the FIA Formula 3 European Championship and the GP3 Series, as part of the Formula 1 support schedule.

Teaming up with Trident Racing to contest all eight rounds, beginning in the first round at Catalunya and culminating in the final round at Sochi.

Taking to the track as part of the 30-car field, the championship saw Devlin fighting wheel-to-wheel against the fiercely competitive field and advancing through the pack at every opportunity. Quick to get to grips with the new machinery, Round 2 at Paul Ricard saw Devlin making up 13 places in the opening stages of the first race, before unfortunately retiring from the race. His strong racing form continued throughout the season, with a series of impressive fights through the pack. Narrowly missing out on points at the Red Bull Ring, he further impressed with strong results at  Hungaroring, Monza and the closing round at Sochi.

In February 2020, it was announced that Devlin would rejoin Trident Racing for a second year in the championship

Asian Formula 3 
During the 2019/2020 winter break Devlin teamed up with Absolute Racing, contesting in the 2019/20 F3 Asian Championship certified by FIA to retain his racing sharpness over the European winter break  racing across Asia and the Middle East. Enjoying considerable success securing 3 podiums, a pole position and points in every race he competed in. Devlin missed the last 2 rounds of the championship over fears surrounding the spread of the Coronavirus

WeatherTech SportsCar Championship 
Away from single-seaters, Devlin has also shown his skill, racing in the WeatherTech SportsCar Championship. Joining the 24 Hours of Daytona 2018 grid Devlin made his first appearance with JDC-Miller MotorSports in the Oreca-Gibson car, affectionately dubbed the ‘Banana Boat’. Placing an impressive 6th on debut, in his first ever endurance race. Returning for the ‘Petit Le Mans’ event at Road Atlanta in October, Devlin and his teammates finished in 9th place.

2019 saw Devlin return to contest the 57th running of the Daytona 24 with JDC MotorSports behind the wheel of the Cadillac DPi, as the youngest prototype driver on the grid. Racing through tough conditions alongside teammates Misha Goikhberg, Tristan Vautier and Rubens Barrichello, the race ended ahead of the 22nd hour of racing, due to heavy rainfall, which placed the car in 5th place at the flag.

Road to Indy 
In 2020, DeFrancesco joined Andretti Steinbrenner Autosport and competed at the 2020 Indy Pro 2000 Championship. He scored two wins, nine top 5s, and was runner-up to Sting Ray Robb.

The Canadian moved to Indy Lights in 2021. With two podiums and nine top 5s, he finished 6th in points.

IndyCar 
DeFrancesco joined the IndyCar Series for the 2022 season, continuing his relationship with Andretti Steinbrenner Autosport. He had a best result of 12th at Gateway and ranked 23rd in the driver's standings.

Racing record

Career summary

† As DeFrancesco was a guest driver, he was ineligible for points.
‡ Points only counted towards the Michelin Endurance Cup, and not the overall LMP2 Championship.
* Season still in progress.

Complete Toyota Racing Series results 
(key) (Races in bold indicate pole position) (Races in italics indicate fastest lap)

Complete F4 British Championship results 
(key) (Races in bold indicate pole position; races in italics indicate fastest lap)

Complete Euroformula Open Championship results 
(key) (Races in bold indicate pole position; races in italics indicate points for the fastest lap of top ten finishers)

Complete FIA Formula 3 European Championship results
(key) (Races in bold indicate pole position) (Races in italics indicate fastest lap) 

† As DeFrancesco was a guest driver, he was ineligible for points.

Complete Macau Grand Prix results

Complete GP3 Series results
(key) (Races in bold indicate pole position) (Races in italics indicate fastest lap)

† Driver did not finish the race, but was classified as he completed over 90% of the race distance.

Complete IMSA SportsCar Championship Results
(key) (Races in bold indicate pole position; races in italics indicate fastest lap)

† Points only counted towards the Michelin Endurance Cup, and not the overall LMP2 Championship.
* Season still in progress.

Complete FIA Formula 3 Championship results
(key) (Races in bold indicate pole position; races in italics indicate points for the fastest lap of top ten finishers)

† Driver did not finish the race, but was classified as he completed over 90% of the race distance.

American open-wheel racing results 
(key)

Indy Pro 2000 Championship

Indy Lights

IndyCar Series
(key) (Races in bold indicate pole position; races in italics indicate fastest lap)

Indianapolis 500

References

External links
Official website
Devlin DeFrancesco Driver Profile
Devlin DeFrancesco on Driver Database

2000 births
Living people
Canadian racing drivers
Canadian people of Italian descent
Toyota Racing Series drivers
ADAC Formula 4 drivers
Italian F4 Championship drivers
British F4 Championship drivers
Racing drivers from Ontario
Sportspeople from Toronto
Euroformula Open Championship drivers
FIA Formula 3 European Championship drivers
24 Hours of Daytona drivers
Canadian GP3 Series drivers
FIA Formula 3 Championship drivers
F3 Asian Championship drivers
Indy Pro 2000 Championship drivers
Indy Lights drivers
IndyCar Series drivers
Indianapolis 500 drivers
Ginetta Junior Championship drivers
MP Motorsport drivers
Carlin racing drivers
Trident Racing drivers
Andretti Autosport drivers
WeatherTech SportsCar Championship drivers
Mücke Motorsport drivers
JDC Motorsports drivers
DragonSpeed drivers
Italian racing drivers